Rakshana is a 1993 Telugu-language action film, produced by Akkineni Venkat under the Annapurna Studios banner and directed by Uppalapati Narayana Rao. It stars Nagarjuna and Shobhana, with music composed M. M. Keeravani. Dubbed into Tamil and released as Kaaval Thurai.

Plot
Bose is an A.C.P. from Visakhapatnam who comes to Hyderabad. He stays with his friend. He is known for his righteous but raging actions, and his friend gets worried about it. Bose tries to stop Chinna and Nalla Sreenu, who are both brothers and underworld dons. Bose arrests Chinna as he seeks revenge on him. Meanwhile, Padma falls in love with Bose as they eventually get married and have a daughter. Nalla Sreenu becomes a party president. Bose and his friend try to end Chinna and Nalla Sreenu's schemes and stop their crimes. Chinna kills Bose's friend when the latter and Bose kidnap Chinna. Eventually, Chinna kidnaps Bose's daughter. How Bose saves his daughter and finishes the villains forms the rest of the story.

Cast

 Nagarjuna as A.C.P. Bose
 Shobhana as Padma
 Salim Ghouse as Chinna
 Kota Srinivasa Rao as Nalla Sreenu
 Nassar as Bose's friend
 Brahmanandam
 J. D. Chakravarthy
 M. Balaiah
 Banerjee
 Chinni Jayanth
 Nirmalamma
 Chinna
 Kadambari Kiran
 Ananth
 M. M. Keeravani in a special appearance
 Roja in a special appearance
 Prabhu Deva in a special appearance
 Silk Smitha as an item number

Soundtrack

The film songs were composed by M. M. Keeravani. Music released on AKASH Audio Company.

Awards
Nandi Award for Best Choreographer - Prabhu Deva

References

External links 
 

1993 films
1990s Telugu-language films
1990s police procedural films
Films scored by M. M. Keeravani